Edwin "Jeep" Darragh Brett (March 20, 1914 – May 17, 1989) was a professional American football player. He was drafted in the fourth round of the 1936 NFL Draft. He played two years in the National Football League.

References

Chicago Cardinals players
Pittsburgh Pirates (football) players
Washington State Cougars football players
1914 births
1989 deaths